Flavio Destro (born 28 August 1962) is an Italian football manager and former player, who played as a defender.

Club career

1976–1981: Youth career

Destro began his youth career at local club Torino, where he played for their Allievi and Primavera side.

1981–1982: Reggina

After spending five years with the Granata, Destro signed his first professional contract with Serie C1 club Reggina. In his only season with the Amaranto, he made 19 appearances and scored 1 goal.

1982–1983: Rondinella

At the end of the 1981–82 season, he moved to Rondinella and managed 30 appearances and would again score one goal.

1983–1985: Catanzaro

Destro then spent two seasons at Catanzaro, where he managed 60 appearances and a single goal.

1985–1990: Ascoli

He signed for Ascoli in 1985 and departed the club in 1990. In five seasons at Ascoli, Destro managed 142 appearances and scored 2 goals. His first goal for Ascoli came on 14 February 1988 at home against Milan in Serie A. The Rossoneri then equalised threw Daniele Massaro to make it honours even.

1990–1994: Pescara, Cesena and Empoli

A single season at Pescara was followed by a two-year spell with Cesena. Before hanging up the boots forever, the veteran defender spent one last season at Empoli, where he played 18 times without registering a goal.

Post-retirement
Following his retirement from football, Destro then pursued a career in coaching football. He currently lives in Ascoli Piceno, the birthplace of his son.

Managerial career
Destro managed Lega Pro Seconda Divisione club Montichiari in 2008. He was then made assistant manager at both Crotone in (2009–10), and Torino in (2010–11). Destro returned to former club Ascoli, where he was appointed manager in 2014. Serie D side Fermana announced Destro as their new manager in March 2016. He guided Fermana to promotion to Serie C in 2017, and a place in the Serie C promotion playoffs in 2019. On 14 October 2019, he was fired by Fermana with squad in 16th place and no victories in 5 games.

On 2 November 2020, he was hired by Serie C club Fano. He resigned on 22 March 2021 after a league defeat to Virtus Verona.

Personal life
Destro is the father of Bologna and Italy forward Mattia Destro. His daughter-in-law is the Italian showgirl Ludovica Caramis.

Honours

Club
Ascoli
 Serie B: 1985–86
 Mitropa Cup: 1986–87

References

1962 births
People from Rivoli, Piedmont
Footballers from Piedmont
Living people
Italian footballers
Torino F.C. players
Reggina 1914 players
U.S. Catanzaro 1929 players
Ascoli Calcio 1898 F.C. players
Delfino Pescara 1936 players
A.C. Cesena players
Empoli F.C. players
Serie B players
Association football defenders
Italian football managers
Ascoli Calcio 1898 F.C. managers
Serie C managers
Alma Juventus Fano 1906 managers
Sportspeople from the Metropolitan City of Turin